Strepsicrates semicanella is a species of moth of the family Tortricidae first described by Francis Walker in 1866. It is found in south-east Asia (including Seram Island) and in New Caledonia, Australia (where it has been recorded from Queensland, Western Australia, the Northern Territory and New South Wales) and Japan. The habitat consists of alluvial forests.

The wingspan is about 20 mm. The forewings are speckled brown with a dark mark near the tornus. The hindwings are brown with dark veins.

The larvae feed on Eucalyptus and Psidium species.

References

Moths described in 1866
Eucosmini